The Mizoram women's cricket team is a women's cricket team that represents the Indian state of Mizoram. They were formed ahead of the 2018–19 season, and compete in the Women's Senior One Day Trophy and the Senior Women's T20 League.

History
Mizoram Women were formed ahead of the 2018–19 season, after an expansion of teams in Indian domestic cricket. In their first season, they competed in the Senior Women's One Day League and in the Senior Women's T20 League, but finished bottom of their group in both competitions.

The following season, 2019–20, Mizoram finished 6th in the Plate competition of the Senior Women's One Day League and 7th in their Senior Women's T20 League group. The following season, 2020–21, with only the One Day League going ahead, Mizoram won the Plate competition, with 5 wins from their six games and gaining promotion to the Elite Group for the following season, but were eliminated from the knockout stages in the subsequent play-off against Odisha. Mizoram batter Buley Ruchita was the fourth-highest run-scorer across the whole competition, with 332 runs at an average of 66.40. They finished sixth in their group in both competitions in 2021–22. They won one match in each of the two competitions in 2022–23.

Seasons

Women's Senior One Day Trophy

Senior Women's T20 League

See also
 Mizoram cricket team

References

Women's cricket teams in India
Cricket in Mizoram
Cricket clubs established in 2018
2018 establishments in Mizoram